Asmita Ale (Nepali: अस्मिता आले, born 3 November 2001) is an English professional footballer currently playing as a defender for Tottenham Hotspur in the FA Women's Super League.

The daughter of a former Gurkha soldier, she joined Aston Villa at the age of eight. She received her first professional contract after turning 18 in late 2019, becoming the first footballer of Nepalese origin to sign with a Premier League side.

Career statistics

Club

Notes

References

2001 births
Living people
English women's footballers
England women's youth international footballers
Women's association football defenders
Aston Villa W.F.C. players
Tottenham Hotspur F.C. Women players
Women's Championship (England) players
Women's Super League players
British people of Nepalese descent
British Asian footballers